KETQ-LP (93.3 FM) is an American radio station licensed to serve the community of Yuba City, California.  The station's broadcast license was issued in February 2015.

Programming
KETQ-LP broadcasts a community radio format including a mix of 1980's, 1990's and today's music, plus local community events. The station is the home of Captain, Gary and John in the morning in which they interview local business owners, civic organizers, community leaders, and everyday people who are making a difference in the lives of this community.  93Q is also an outlet for local sports. The station brought local high school baseball back to the radio in 2015.  The station is heard live on the internet via Tune-In - look for KETQ or ask your Alexa, "Play KETQ".

Air Staff

 Morning Show - 6 to 9 AM  Captain, Gary and John Black
 Drive Home Show - The Drive Home Guy 4 to 6 PM
 Weather - Kurt Baird
 Other Great Guys and Gals - The Fish / Ali / Cami Oh & Randy Warner / Stephanie / Danny Taylor

History
This station received its original construction permit from the Federal Communications Commission on August 20, 2014. The new station was assigned the KETQ-LP call sign by the FCC on December 16, 2014. KETQ-LP received its license to cover from the FCC on February 9, 2015.

See also
List of community radio stations in the United States

References

External links
93Q Radio official website

2015 establishments in California
Community radio stations in the United States
ETQ-LP
Radio stations established in 2015
ETQ-LP
Yuba City, California
Companies based in Yuba County, California
American radio networks